North Umbria may refer to:
 The north of Umbria, a region in Italy
 Northumbria, medieval kingdom in what is now Northern England and South-East Scotland

May also be in relation to the university or the ship